Manuel António de Sousa (10 November 1835 in Mapuçá, Goa, Portuguese India – 20 January 1892 in Portuguese Mozambique), also known as Gouveia, was a Portuguese merchant of Goan origin and military captain of Manica and Quiteve (Kiteve).

Biography 
Manuel António de Sousa was born in Mapuçá, Bardez municipality (Goa) in 1835. He was the son of Félix de Sousa, landlord and proprietor, and D. Doroteia Tomásia Mascarenhas. He studied at the Rachol Seminary in Salcete, Goa, until he reached the age of 16.

Migration to Africa

In 1853 he emigrated to Zambézia, to assist in the administration of the estate of his uncle Félix Mascarenhas. On his arrival in Portuguese Mozambique, he married his cousin, Maria Anastácia Mascarenhas, the only daughter of his uncle. He became established as a businessman in the Sena region. Speedily, he made a fortune in the ivory trade and gained power in the region. Armed elephant hunters formed the core of his personal militia. 

He won a reputation for his loyalty both to the governor-general and the Kingdom of Portugal, and relentlessly fought the chiefs and indigenous kings to expand his personal empire. In 1856 he took part in the war of succession of the local kingdom of Gaza and settled in the mountains of Gorongosa, where he established the basis of an aringas system which, together with his private army, was used to defend his interests.

Help in battles

Several times Gouveia's forces helped the Portuguese official forces in their battles, particularly in campaigns against the Bonga.

In 1863, on account of the services rendered, he succeeded Isidoro Correia Pereira as the chief captain of Manica and Quiteve (Kiteve).

During his absence from Sena, to receive the commission, his position in Gorongosa was taken by Umzila, the winner of the battle for the Gazaland throne, and only at a cost could he recover the territories.

Lord of Manica

Around 1874 he was recognized as the Lord of Manica, and married the daughter of the Báruè king. Their son was later recognized as king of that region.

Manuel António de Sousa became a close friend of artillery captain Joaquim Carlos Paiva de Andrada, one of the mentors of the Companhia de Moçambique. A raid in support of the Mutassa chief, on land disputed by Cecil Rhodes's British South African Company, led to them being taken prisoner by the police of that company, which resulted in a diplomatic conflict between the Portuguese and British Empires. They were eventually released following the intervention of the Portuguese government.

During his arrest a rumour surfaced that he had been killed, and this led to an agitation among the Báruè population. Gouveia died in combat while trying to regain control of Báruè.

Role in history

Malyn Newitt describes Manuel António de Sousa as "a new name ...  beginning to be heard in the 1850s" who was to become "in some ways the greatest of the muzungo warlords, but he did not belong to a traditional Zambesian family and cannot strictly be called Afro-Portuguese. In Portuguese parlance he was a Canarin, an Indian from Goa."(p 288) Newitt writes that Sousa "made a fortune in ivory trading and his armed elephant hunters formed the nucleus of a private army which he repeatedly made available to the Portuguese authorities during the Zambesi wars." (p 288) He is said to have built up the reputation of working with the government and being a loyal subject of Portugal while "ruthlessly building up his own private empire on the fringes of the Portuguese colony." (p 289)

Souza took advantage of the death of Gazaland king Soshangane in 1856, and the subsequent succession dispute, to establish himself in the interior in Gorongosa. Around 1875, says Newitt, "Souza (sic) had by that time become as important a figure as the Gaza king in the politics of the area."

Tributes 
This statue was destroyed on 15 December 1961 by a bombing just prior to the military action that led to the integration of Goa into India.

Bibliography 
 GALVÃO, Henrique. Ronda de África. Porto: Editorial "Jornal de Notícias", 1950.
 ANDRADA, Joaquim Carlos Paiva de. Relatório de uma viagem à terra dos landins.. Lisboa: Imprensa Nacional, 1885.
 ANDRADA, Joaquim Carlos Paiva de. Relatório de uma viagem à terra do changamira.. Lisboa: Imprensa Nacional, 1886.

References
 

History of Mozambique
1892 deaths
1835 births
Portuguese people of Goan descent
19th-century Portuguese people
19th-century Portuguese businesspeople
Colonialism
People from Mapusa